Harpers Crossroads is an unincorporated community in Chatham County, North Carolina, United States. It is located at the intersection of State Highway 902, and Siler City Glendon Rd.

External links

 

Unincorporated communities in Chatham County, North Carolina
Unincorporated communities in North Carolina